Gluta renghas (rengas) is a species of plant in the family Anacardiaceae. It is found in Indonesia.

renghas
Flora of Malesia